Ceramoporidae is a family of bryozoans placed in the Cystoporata. Species are from the Paleozoic.

References 

Cystoporida
Bryozoan families
Prehistoric protostome families
Prehistoric bryozoans
Paleozoic invertebrates